Orange Township is one of twenty-one townships in Knox County, Illinois, USA.  As of the 2010 census, its population was 556 and it contained 246 housing units.

Geography

Unincorporated towns
 DeLong at 
(This list is based on USGS data and may include former settlements.)

Cemeteries
The township contains these five cemeteries: Cook, Ferguson, Haynes, Mather and McCallister.

Lakes
 Horseshoe Lake

Demographics

School districts
 Abingdon Community Unit School District 217
 Galesburg Community Unit School District 205
 Knoxville Community Unit School District 202

Political districts
 Illinois's 17th congressional district
 State House District 74
 State Senate District 37

References
 
 United States Census Bureau 2009 TIGER/Line Shapefiles
 United States National Atlas

External links
 City-Data.com
 Illinois State Archives
 Township Officials of Illinois

Townships in Knox County, Illinois
Galesburg, Illinois micropolitan area
Townships in Illinois